Laurent Cazenave (born 25 April 1978, in Pau) is a French auto racing driver. In 1997 he finished third in Class B of the French Formula Ford Championship. From there he switched to saloon car racing in 1999, with two years in the French Super Production Championship. He finished third in his second year with two race wins, driving a Peugeot 306. Since then he has competed regularly in the French GT Championship, driving cars such as a Porsche 996, a Chrysler Viper, and most recently a Corvette C5 in 2008. In 2001 he drove in six rounds of the FIA GT Championship in a Porsche 911 for Haberthur Racing. The team got just three points in the N-GT Class. 
He made a brief return to touring cars in 2008, entering two rounds of the FIA World Touring Car Championship at his home town of Pau. He drove for the Wiechers-Sport Team finishing sixteenth in race one, and retiring in race two. He did this again at the 2009 round at Pau, with a fourteenth and a retirement, scoring six points towards the independents championship.

Racing record

Complete 24 Hours of Le Mans results

Complete WTCC results
(key) (Races in bold indicate pole position) (Races in italics indicate fastest lap)

Complete GT1 World Championship results

References

French racing drivers
1978 births
Living people
FIA GT Championship drivers
World Touring Car Championship drivers
FIA GT1 World Championship drivers
Blancpain Endurance Series drivers